Sweden competed at the 2018 Winter Olympics in PyeongChang, South Korea, from 9 to 25 February 2018. The Swedish Olympic Committee (Swedish: Sveriges Olympiska Kommitté, SOK) sent 116 athletes to the Games, 62 men and 54 women, to compete in nine sports. Jennie-Lee Burmansson set a new record as the youngest Swedish Winter Olympic participant.

The team was highly successful, having won 7 gold, 6 silver and 1 bronze medal and earning the 6th place in the medal table. The result matched the number of Winter Olympic gold medals won in Torino in 2006 but beat that record by having more silver medals. The overall medal count of 14 was only one short of Sweden's Winter Olympic record, set in Sochi in 2014 with 15 medals.

Medalists

Competitors
The following is the list of number of competitors participating at the Games per sport/discipline.

Sweden also obtained a quota place in men's short track speed skating, but the Swedish Olympic Committee declined to send any athlete.

Alpine skiing 

Men

Women

Mixed

Biathlon 

Based on their Nations Cup rankings in the 2016–17 Biathlon World Cup, Sweden has qualified a team of 5 men and 5 women.

Men

Women

Mixed

Cross-country skiing 

Distance
Men

Women

Sprint
Men

Women

Maja Dahlqvist, Gustav Eriksson, Emil Jönsson, Maria Nordström, Björn Sandström and Emma Wikén were also registered as members of the Swedish squad but were not selected for any of the events.

Curling 

Summary

Men's tournament

Sweden has qualified their men's team (five athletes), by finishing in the top seven teams in Olympic Qualification points.

Team: Niklas Edin (skip), Oskar Eriksson, Rasmus Wranå, Christoffer Sundgren, Henrik Leek (reserve)

Round-robin
Sweden has a bye in draws 3, 7 and 11.

Draw 1
Wednesday, 14 February, 09:05

Draw 2
Wednesday, 14 February, 20:05

Draw 4
Friday, 16 February, 09:05

Draw 5
Friday, 16 February, 20:05

Draw 6
Saturday, 17 February, 14:05

Draw 8
Sunday, 18 February, 20:05

Draw 9
Monday, 19 February, 14:05

Draw 10
Tuesday, 20 February, 09:05

Draw 12
Wednesday, 21 February, 14:05

Semifinal
Thursday, 22 February, 20:05

Final
Saturday, 24 February, 15:35

Women's tournament

Sweden has qualified their women's team (five athletes), by finishing in the top seven teams in Olympic Qualification points.

Team: Anna Hasselborg (skip), Sara McManus, Agnes Knochenhauer, Sofia Mabergs, Jennie Wåhlin (reserve)

Round-robin
Sweden has a bye in draws 2, 6 and 10.

Draw 1
Wednesday, 14 February, 14:05

Draw 3
Thursday, 15 February, 20:05

Draw 4
Friday, 16 February, 14:05

Draw 5
Saturday, 17 February, 09:05

Draw 7
Sunday, 18 February, 14:05

Draw 8
Monday, 19 February, 09:05

Draw 9
Monday, 19 February, 20:05

Draw 11
Wednesday, 21 February, 09:05

Draw 12
Wednesday, 21 February, 20:05

Semifinal
Friday, 23 February, 20:05

Final
Sunday, 25 February, 09:05

Figure skating 

Sweden had originally qualified one male and one female figure skater, based on its placement at the 2017 Nebelhorn Trophy in Oberstdorf, Germany. One of the original competitors, Alexander Majorov, withdrew in January 2018 due to personal commitments.

Freestyle skiing 

Moguls

Ski cross

Slopestyle

Ice hockey 

Summary

Men's tournament

Sweden men's national ice hockey team qualified by finishing 3rd in the 2015 IIHF World Ranking.

Team roster

Preliminary round

Quarterfinal

Women's tournament

Sweden women's national ice hockey team qualified by finishing 5th in the 2016 IIHF World Ranking.

Team roster

Preliminary round

Quarterfinal

5–8th place semifinal

Seventh place game

Snowboarding 

Freestyle

Speed skating

See also
Sweden at the 2018 Summer Youth Olympics
Sweden at the 2018 Winter Paralympics

References

Nations at the 2018 Winter Olympics
2018
Winter Olympics